The first season of The Great Australian Spelling Bee premiered on Network Ten on 3 August 2015. The season was hosted by Grant Denyer and Chrissie Swan, and also starred Chris Edmund as pronouncer.

Anirudh won the season, receiving a $50,000 education scholarship, $10,000 worth of equipment for his school, a Macquarie Dictionary, a Sprout computer, and a HP Pro Slate 8 tablet in prizes. In addition, the five runners-up received scholarships worth $10,000, a HP Pro Slate 8 tablet, and $1,000 of education goods for their school.

Contestants

The series began with 52 contestants aged 8–13 years old which was cut down to the Top 26.

Episodes

Episode 1
This episode consisted of 4 person heats, with 2 in each group winning a spot in the top 26.

Episode 2
At the beginning of the episode it was announced that Emma had to quit the competition due to family reasons. Because of this Harpith (as the most successful eliminated contestant) was brought back into the competition. In the first challenge of the season Speed Spell, the spellers had to spell as many words as they could in a limited amount of time the top 10 spellers would win immunity. The people that won immunity were Ben, Mica, Grace D, Anirudh, Marko, Amanda, Jack B, Amelia, Bella, Aimee in no particular order. In the second competition Speed Spell 1v1 writing competitions happened the winner of the 1v1 would win immunity. In the final competition before the spelling bee the 8 remaining spellers had to see if the word was misspelled if it was then the speller had to spell correctly that word. If they got it right for the misspelled word AND spelled the word correctly they would get immunity.
The spelling bee lasted 1 round because Jack and Joshua got their words wrong round 1.

Episode 3

Episode 4
At the end of Speed Spell, the Top 6 were deemed safe from elimination. In no particular order, those spellers were Marko, Anirudh, Mica, Tej, Grace D and Jack B. The remaining 12 spellers went head-to-head in Flash Cards, where the theme was technology. The winning  spellers, Harrison, Aimee, Amelia, Amanda, Holly R and Stuart were then safe from elimination. In the final spelling bee, 6 spellers spelling in multiple rounds to determine the 2 spellers who would be safe from elimination (Jye and Grace P). The other 4 spellers, Ben, Bella, Timothy and Josie were sent home.

Episode 5
In the Final Spelling Bee, Yellow Team was facing defeat against Green Team. It was a three-on-one situation, as Green Team had three members and Yellow Team only had Mica as their last member. However, Mica rallied in an impressive showing to obtain an astounding come-from-behind victory and gain immunity for her team.

Ratings
 Colour key:
  Highest rating episode during the series
  Lowest rating episode during the series

References

2015 Australian television seasons